The following are the national records in athletics in Thailand maintained by Athletic Association of Thailand (AAT).

Outdoor

Key to tables:

+ = en route to a longer distance

A = affected by altitude

Men

Women

Mixed

Indoor

Men

Women

Notes

References
General
Thai Absolute Records 27 April 2019 updated
Specific

External links
AAT web site

Thailand
Records In Athletics
Athletics
Athletics